Mable Mathews was an American politician from Sundance, Wyoming who served a single term in the Wyoming House of Representatives. She was elected in 1928, and represented Crook County from 1929 to 1931 as a Republican in the 20th Wyoming Legislature. Mathews represented Crook County alongside H. L. Sims.

Notes

References

External links
Official page at the Wyoming Legislature

Year of birth missing
Year of death missing
20th-century American women politicians
Republican Party members of the Wyoming House of Representatives
Women state legislators in Wyoming
People from Sundance, Wyoming